Albertus Henricus Wiese  (1761–1810) was Governor-General of the Dutch East Indies from 1805 to 1808, during which time the United Provinces became, during the French Revolutionary and Napoleonic Wars,  first  the Batavian Republic and then the Kingdom of Holland. Dutch possessions in the Indies were under pressure from other European powers, particularly Great Britain, while local kings and princes took the opportunity of troubled times to reassert themselves. Weakness of control from the homeland led to a growth of corruption, nepotism and lawlessness in the Dutch East Indies.

Albert Wiese was born in Bremen (in present-day Germany) in 1761. He served as Governor-General during the last years of the Batavian Republic and the early years of the Kingdom of Holland. During his time in office the British invaded Java. To reassert control, the government sent the revolutionary General Daendels, who promptly took over from Wiese and tried to drive out the British. A future Governor-General, and Minister for the Colonies, Johannes van den Bosch, was adjutant-general under Governor-General Wiese.

Notes

1761 births
1810 deaths
Governors-General of the Dutch East Indies
People from Bremen
19th-century Dutch East Indies people